Euploea hewitsonii, or Hewitson's dwarf crow, is a butterfly in the family Nymphalidae. It was described by Cajetan Felder and Rudolf Felder in 1865. It is found in the Australasian realm.

Subspecies
E. h. hewitsonii (Sulawesi, Banggai)
E. h. mangolina (Fruhstorfer, 1899) (Sula Mangoli)
E. h. besinensis (Fruhstorfer, 1899) (Sula Besi)
E. h. reducta Jurriaanse, 1920 (Buton, Kabaena, Muna)

References

External links
Euploea at Markku Savela's Lepidoptera and Some Other Life Forms

Euploea
Butterflies described in 1865
Butterflies of Indonesia
Taxa named by Baron Cajetan von Felder
Taxa named by Rudolf Felder